Karanakodam is a region in the city of Kochi, in the state of Kerala, India. This is a predominantly residential zone with facilities like grocery stores, schools, medical clinics, libraries, temples, churches and mosques.

References

Neighbourhoods in Kochi
Regions of Kochi
Suburbs of Kochi